Parnara naso, the African straight or straight swift, is a skipper butterfly belonging to the family Hesperiidae. It is found on Mauritius, Réunion and Madagascar. The habitat consists of forest margins and anthropogenic environments.

The larvae feed on Oryza sativa and Saccharum officinarum.

Subspecies
Parnara naso naso (Mauritius)
Parnara naso bigutta Evans, 1937 (Reunion)
Parnara naso poutieri (Boisduval, 1833) (Madagascar)

References

Hesperiinae
Butterflies described in 1798
Butterflies of Indochina